The RER station Val de Fontenay is in the Paris suburb Fontenay-sous-Bois.  It is on the Paris-Est–Mulhouse-Ville railway and provides an interchange between the RER lines A and E. In the future, Paris Metro Line 15, and extensions of Paris Metro Line 1 and Tram 1 will go here as well.

The station
The station is named for a neighborhood of Fontenay-sous-Bois. It is served by line A (branch A4) and line E (branch E4).

Traffic
, the estimated annual attendance was 14,295,323 passengers according the RATP Group and 17,693,555 passengers according the SNCF.

This attendance makes this station the second busiest station in the Val-de-Marne department.

RER A
On the A line, Val de Fontenay is the first station on the branch A4, leading to Marne-la-Vallée–Chessy and is also the busiest in terms of trains. Val de Fontenay (like Noisy-le-Grand-Mont d'Est) is served by every train running on this branch, unlike others which are skipped at certain times of day (Bry-sur-Marne and Lognes).

The station is served in each direction by:
 12–18 trains  on peak travel times.
 9 trains per hour on off-peak hours.
 6 trains per hour on week-ends.
 4 trains per hour in the late evening.

Additional trains in off-peak times 
Starting 4 February 2008, RATP changed the number of trains running on the RER A. In off-peak hours, there are now 12 trains per hour instead of 6. Of those 12 trains going to Marne-la-Vallée, 6 are direct between Val de Fontenay and Noisy-le-Grand (the stations of Neuilly-Plaisance and Bry-sur-Marne are skipped). This allows a passenger to save 2 minutes between Val de Fontenay and Noisy-le-Grand, as the trip drops from 7 minutes to 5 minutes without the two stops.

RER E 
Since 30 August 1999, Val de Fontenay has also been served by the RER E. This is the branch E4, going between Haussmann–Saint-Lazare and Tournan. Train service on the E line consists of 6 trains per hour during the week in both directions. Towards Tournan, there are 4 trains per hour to Villiers-sur-Marne and 2 trains per hour to Tournan. Towards Haussmann–Saint-Lazare, trains coming from Villiers-sur-Marne stop at all stations, while trains coming from Tournan stop only at Noisy-le-Sec, Pantin, Rosa Parks and Magenta. In the evening, there are 4 trains per hour, alternating between Villiers-sur-Marne and Tournan and stopping at all stations.

Bus connections 

The station is served by several buses:
 Les Autobus du Fort Bus network line : 702 ;

Gallery

References

External links

 

Réseau Express Régional stations
Railway stations in France opened in 1977
Railway stations in Val-de-Marne